The 2021–22 North Alabama Lions women's basketball team represented University of North Alabama during the 2021–22 NCAA Division I women's basketball season. They were led by head coach Missy Tiber in her ninth season at North Alabama. The Lions played their home games at the Flowers Hall in Florence, Alabama as members of the Atlantic Sun Conference.

This was North Alabama's final of a four-year transition period from Division II to Division I. As a result, the Lions are not eligible for NCAA postseason play but are eligible to participate in the ASUN Tournament.

Previous season
The Lions finished the 2020–21 season 7–18, (6–9) to finish in sixth place in ASUN play. They advanced to the quarter-finals of the conference tournament.

Roster

Schedule

Source

|-
!colspan=12 style=| Non-Conference Regular Season

|-
!colspan=12 style=| ASUN Regular Season

|-
!colspan=12 style=| Atlantic Sun Tournament

References

North Alabama
North Alabama Lions women's basketball seasons
North Alabama Lions women's basketball
North Alabama Lions women's basketball